Gestroania is a genus of beetles in the family Carabidae, containing the following species:

 Gestroania amplipennis (Gestro, 1875)
 Gestroania froggatti Macleay, 1888
 Gestroania setipennis Baehr, 2005
 Gestroania storeyi Baehr, 2005

References

Lebiinae